Mirihi is a small island in the Alif Dhaal Atoll. It measures approximately 300m by 50m.

Since 1989 hosts a "tourist island" and it was the first island in the Maldives with overwater bungalows.

The holiday resort consists of 38 guest bungalows consisting of 6 beach villas, 28 overwater villas and 2 overwater suites.

In addition, Mirihi is the username of an online influencer on youtube. Who has declared that they have “no affiliation with the island resort”. However, fans have speculated that this is actually the place of residence of the you-tuber.

House Reef & Diving 

Mirihi's house reef is worthy of note as it is in excellent condition and accessible directly from the resort's beach.

Since 1994 the dive center on the island is operated by Ocean-Pro Mirihi. They are a 5-star PADI dive center.

The Madivaru "Manta Reef" is close by and is a location where a lot of manta rays can be found year-round.

In September 2000 a small trawler called the "Madi-ge", which can be translated as "House of Rays", was sunk to 22 meters close to the house reef allowing wreck divers to explore it. The "Madi-ge" lies bow down in the sand and attracts Batfish, Glassfish and Jacks.

External links
 Web presence of the holiday resort located at Mirihi.

References 

Islands of the Maldives